Odetta dekleini is a species of sea snail, a marine gastropod mollusk in the family Pyramidellidae, the pyrams and their allies.

Description
The shell size varies between 1.1 mm and 1.3 mm

Distribution
This species occurs in the Atlantic Ocean off the Cape Verde Islands and São Tomé and Principe.

References

External links
 To Encyclopedia of Life
 

Pyramidellidae
Gastropods described in 1998
Molluscs of the Atlantic Ocean
Gastropods of Cape Verde
Invertebrates of São Tomé and Príncipe